The Odino culture is the archeological culture of foot hunters named after the settlement Odino in the basin of the lower Ishim river in Western Siberia. The culture includes two phases, the older from 2900–2500 BC, the younger from 2300–1900 BC. The Odino culture covers an island surrounded by forest-steppe type cultural array. Its settlements are situated along the terraces of the rivers and creeks. Certain insufficiently understood dwellings appear to be dug-outs. It is thought that Odinov culture rose from Eneolithic forest- steppe cultures in the Ishim area.

Economy
The available materials indicate the beginning of a tradition of an economy based on animal husbandry. Osteological material is represented exclusively by domesticated animals' bones indicating the central role of animal husbandry to the Odinov economy. Similarity with typical products of tin bronze alloys indicate affiliation with the Seima-Turbino phenomenon. The Odinov culture stone industry has not been fully studied.

Archeology
Odinov culture burials are similar to those of the Krotov culture, which indicate the presence of common rituals typical for the cultures of the northern forest-steppe belonging to the Seima Turbino metallurgical province.

The Odinov culture is notable for its ceramics, with dishes decorated with comb impressions with or without  rows of pit indentations, coarse textile prints, and some pit ornament elements forming geometrical figures. Odinov culture is marked by specific borrowings in ornamentation, including pseudo-textile prints, which indicates close ties with the taiga populations.

References

Literature
 Молодин. В. И. др. Радиоуглеродная хронология култур эпохи Бронзы. [RADIOCARBON CHRONOLOGY OF THE SOUTH URALS AND THE SOUTH OF THE WESTERN SIBERIA CULTURES (2000–2013-YEARS INVESTIGATIONS): PRINCIPLES AND APPROACHES, ACHIEVEMENTS AND PROBLEMS]. УДК 902.652 (2014). ISSN 1818-7919.
 Volkov E.N. (2004) "Odinov  Bronze Age culture"//Great Tumen encyclopedia. Tyumen, Tyumen University Press, Vol. 2, p. 384 (In Russian)
 Kosarev M.F., "Bronze Age in Western Siberia", Moscow, 1981 (In Russian)
 Chlenova N.L., Dating of Irmen culture//Chronology and cultural affiliation problems of archaeological sites in Western Siberia, Tomsk, 1970, pp. 133–149 (In Russian)
 Chikisheva T.A., Dynamics of anthropological differentiation in population of southern Western Siberia in Neolithic - Early Iron Age, Professorial dissertation, Novosibirsk, 2010, section Conclusions http://www.dissercat.com/content/dinamika-antropologicheskoi-differentsiatsii-naseleniya-yuga-zapadnoi-sibiri-v-epokhi-neolit (In Russian)

Archaeological cultures of Northern Asia
Bronze Age cultures of Asia
Archaeological cultures in Russia
Archaeological cultures in Kazakhstan
Finno-Ugric archaeological cultures
Archaeological cultures of Siberia